Urban Knights II is an album by the Urban Knights which was issued in 1997 on GRP Records. The album reached No. 5 on the Billboard Top Contemporary Jazz Albums Chart.

Critical reception

Jazz Times stated "With moods playful to passionate and players in a relaxed goodtime frame of mind, it’s a perfect party disc."
Don Adderton of the Sun Herald wrote "When you surround a master artist with a strong supporting cast, usually great things happen. On this second outing, Ramsey Lewis scores big on Urban Knights II (GRP)." Adderton added "Still the master craftsman, Lewis leads this all-star aggregation rampaging into funk, jazz, rhythm-and-blues and Latin-flavored ballads." Don Heckman of the Los Angeles Times found that "The music that results can perhaps best be described as rhythm & jazz--bits and pieces of improvising from Lewis and the horn players juxtaposed against insistent, funk-driven rhythms. South African Butler, especially on the tracks in which he sings (“South African Jam” and “Brazilian Rain,” especially), brings a seductive world-music ambience to the proceedings."
Jonathan Widran of Allmusic called the album a "Maurice White-produced exercise in easy funk and potent, machine generated urban grooves."

Track listing 
 "Scirroco" (Meyers, White) – 4:03 
 "Get Up" (Lewis, Lewis, Randolph) – 3:47 
 "Come Dance with Me" (Boyd, Lewis, Randolph) – 4:01 
 "South African Jam" (Butler) – 4:51 
 "Brazilian Rain" (Emory, Pleasure) – 4:19 
 "Interlude #1" (Lewis) – 0:35 
 "Summer Nights" (Meyers, Randolph, White) – 5:32 
 "Tell Me Why" (Butler, Meyers, Williams) – 4:19 
 "Urban Paradise" (Lewis, Lewis, Randolph) – 4:23 
 "Drama" (Cornwell, Guillaume, Hawkins, Jones) – 3:47 
 "Step by Step" (Lewis, Lewis, Randolph) – 4:01 
 "The Promise" (Meyers, Vannelli, White) – 4:10 
 "Interlude #2" (Lewis) – 2:02
 "Dawn" (Randolph) – 4:38

Charts

Personnel
 Gerald Albright – soprano saxophone
 Najee – flute, saxophone, soprano saxophone
 Frayne Lewis – keyboards
 Ramsey Lewis – piano, electric piano
 Mike Logan – keyboards
 Bill Meyers – synthesizer, backing vocals, Fender Rhodes
 Jimi Randolph – synthesizer
 Kevin Randolph – keyboards, synthesizer bass
 Jonathan Butler – guitar, vocals, backing vocals
 Sheldon Reynolds – guitar, backing vocals
 Morris Pleasure – bass
 Chuck Webb – bass
 Verdine White – bass
 Sonny Emory – drums
 Tony Carpenter – percussion
 Paulinho Da Costa – percussion
 Karen Boyd – backing vocals
 Carl Carwell – backing vocals
 Theresa Davis – backing vocals
 Valerie Mayo – backing vocals
 Maurice White – backing vocals

References

1997 albums
Albums produced by Maurice White
Urban Knights albums
GRP Records albums